The Parker 180 is a fountain pen developed in the 1970s by the Parker Pen Company.  Introduced to market in 1977 as an attempt to modernize the then-floundering fountain pen industry, the 180 was a slender pen with a very unusual flat nib design.  The "180" is a play on 180°, because the pen was meant to be used in either a rightside-up or upside-down orientation to modify the width of the line drawn by the pen.  It was offered in either an "X/M" ("Extra-Fine / Medium") or "F/B" ("Fine / Broad") configuration. Towards the end of its production the nibs made were not two point nibs, and was marked as X, F, M or B.

Like many Parker fountain pens, the 180 had a flexible ink sac reservoir.  To load the pen with ink, one would remove the outer casing of the pen body, lower the nib into a bottle of ink, and squeeze-and-release the ink sac, drawing ink into the pen as the springy rubber sac returned to its rest shape.

References

180